The 1906–07 United States collegiate men's ice hockey season was the 13th season of collegiate ice hockey.

After a few years away Cornell, Rensselaer and Western University of Pennsylvania  restarted their programs.

Regular season

Standings

References

1906–07 NCAA Standings

External links
College Hockey Historical Archives

 
College